Płock (pronounced ) is a city in central Poland, on the Vistula river, in the Masovian Voivodeship. According to the data provided by GUS on 31 December 2021, there were 116,962 inhabitants in the city. Its full ceremonial name, according to the preamble to the City Statute, is Stołeczne Książęce Miasto Płock (the Princely or Ducal Capital City of Płock). It is used in ceremonial documents as well as for preserving an old tradition.

Płock is a capital of the powiat (county) in the west of the Masovian Voivodeship. From 1079 to 1138 it was the capital of Poland. The Wzgórze Tumskie ("Cathedral Hill") with the Płock Castle and the Catholic Cathedral, which contains the sarcophagi of a number of Polish monarchs, is listed as a Historic Monument of Poland. It was the main city and administrative center of Mazovia in the Middle Ages before the rise of Warsaw as a major city of Poland, and later it remained a royal city of Poland. It is the cultural, academic, scientific, administrative and transportation center of the west and north Masovian region. Płock is the seat of the Roman Catholic Diocese of Płock, one of the oldest dioceses in Poland, founded in the 11th century, and it is also the worldwide headquarters of the Mariavite Church. In Płock are located also the Marshal Stanisław Małachowski High School, the oldest school in Poland and one of the oldest in Central Europe, and the Płock refinery, the country's largest oil refinery.

History

Middle Ages

The area was long inhabited by pagan peoples. In the 10th century, a fortified location was established high of the Vistula River's bank. This location was at a junction of shipping and routes and was strategic for centuries. Its location was a great asset. In 1009 a Benedictine monastery was established here. It became a center of science and art for the area.

During the rule of the first monarchs of the Piast dynasty, even prior to the Baptism of Poland, Płock served as one of the monarchial seats, including that of Prince Mieszko I and King Bolesław I the Brave. The king built the original fortifications on Cathedral Hill, overlooking the Vistula River. From 1037 to 1047, Płock was capital of the independent Mazovian state of Miecław. Płock has been the residence of many Mazovian princes. In 1075, a diocese seat was created here for the Roman Catholic church. From 1079 to 1138, during the reign of the Polish monarchs Władysław I Herman and Bolesław III Wrymouth, the city was the capital of Poland, then earning its title as the Ducal Capital City of Płock. As a result of the fragmentation of Poland into smaller duchies, from 1138 it was the capital of the Duchy of Masovia, and afterwards the Duchy of Płock. In 1180 the present-day Marshal Stanisław Małachowski High School (Małachowianka), the oldest still existing school in Poland and one of the oldest in Central Europe, was established. Among its notable graduates is scholar and jurist Paweł Włodkowic, a precursor of religious freedom in Europe, who studied there in the late 14th century.

In 1237 Płock was officially granted town rights, renewed in 1255. In the 14th century King Casimir III the Great vested Płock with vast privileges. The first Jewish settlers came to the city in the 14th century, responding to the extension of rights by the Polish kings. In 1495 the Duchy of Płock was integrated directly with the Polish Crown as a reverted fief.

Modern era

In the early modern period, Płock was a royal city of Poland and capital of the Płock Voivodeship within the larger Greater Poland Province. The 16th century was the golden age of the city, before it suffered major losses in population due to plague, fire, and warfare, with wars between Sweden and Poland in the late 17th and early 18th centuries. At that time, the Swedes destroyed much of the city, but the people rebuilt and recovered. In the late 18th century, it took down the old city walls, and made a New Town, filled with many German migrants.

In the Second Partition of Poland in 1793 the city was annexed by Prussia. From 1807 it was part of the short-lived Polish Duchy of Warsaw and in 1815 it became part of Congress Poland, later on fully annexed by the Russian Empire. In 1831, the last sejm of Congress Poland was held in the Płock town hall. It was a seat of provincial government and an active center; its economy was closely tied to major grain trade. It laid out a new city plan in the early 19th century, as new residents continued to arrive. Many of its finest buildings were constructed in this period in the Neoclassical style. In 1820 the Płock Scientific Society was founded, and in the late 19th century the city began to industrialize. In 1863 local Poles fought in the January Uprising against Russia. The leader of the uprising in the Płock region, Zygmunt Padlewski, was executed by the Russians in Płock in May 1863. In 1905, large demonstrations of Polish youth and workers took place in Płock.

During World War I, Płock was occupied by Germany from 1915 to 1918, and in 1918 Poland regained independence, and Płock was immediately reintegrated with Poland. In August 1920, the city became famous for its successful heroic defense against the Soviets during the Polish–Soviet War. 250 Polish defenders, including 100 civilians, were killed in the battle. In 1921, Marshal Józef Piłsudski visited Płock and awarded the city with the Cross of Valour, making Płock the second Polish city to be awarded with a Polish military decoration (shortly after Lwów).

World War II

Germany invaded Poland in September 1939, the city of Płock was annexed into the Reich as part of the Regierungsbezirk Zichenau. The Germans renamed the city Schröttersburg in 1941 after the former Prussian Baron of the Empire Friedrich Leopold von Schrötter.

As part of the Intelligenzaktion, the Germans carried out mass arrests of Poles, who were then imprisoned in the local prison, and around 200 of whom were murdered in large massacres in Łąck between October 1939 and February 1940. Among the victims were Polish teachers, activists, shopowners, notaries, local officials, pharmacists, directors and members of the Polish Military Organisation. Next mass arrests of about 2,000 Poles from Płock and the Płock County were carried out in April 1940, and in June 1940, another 200 Poles from various settlements in the region were imprisoned in the local prison. Some prisoners were then deported and murdered in the Soldau concentration camp, and some teachers from Płock were among Polish teachers murdered in the Mauthausen concentration camp. In 1940, Germans murdered 80 elderly and disabled people from Płock in the nearby village of Brwilno. The Archbishop of Płock Antoni Julian Nowowiejski and the auxiliary Bishop Leon Wetmański were imprisoned in the nearby village of Słupno, and then in 1941 also murdered in the Soldau concentration camp, where also many other local priests were killed. Nowowiejski and Wetmański are now considered two of the 108 Blessed Polish Martyrs of World War II by the Catholic Church. Poles were also subjected to expulsions, 1,300 Poles were expelled in November and December 1939, and over 4,000 also in February and March 1941. Nazi Germany also deported people as forced laborers for German factories, treating them harshly. The Germans also established and operated two forced labour subcamps of the local prison, and an additional forced labour "education" camp in the city. In the winter of 1942–1943, a freight train with kidnapped Polish children arrived to the Płock-Radziwie station, and around 300 of the children froze to death and were buried by the Germans in the forests of nearby Łąck. Since 1943, the local Sicherheitspolizei carried out deportations of Poles including teenage boys to the Stutthof concentration camp.

At the same time, the Nazis were also brutalizing the Jewish population of Płock. They conscripted them for forced labor and established a Jewish ghetto in Płock in 1940. In that ghetto, up to ten people shared each room. Medical supplies were inadequate and diseases spread. Germans murdered many Jews in Płock but most were deported to other areas and then on to be murdered in Treblinka. By the war's end, only 300 Jewish residents were known to have survived, of more than 10,000 in the region (for more information see Jewish history below). Some Poles in Płock tried to assist their Jewish neighbors by smuggling food to them and sneaking food to them when they were rounded up and had to stand in the street for an entire day on a bitterly cold day waiting to be deported.

Germans closed Polish institutions and the Polish press, and looted or destroyed numerous Polish cultural monuments, collections and archives, including the rich collection of the Płock Scientific Society. The collections of local museums, the cathedral's ancient treasury, church archives and the diocesan library were stolen and taken to museums in Königsberg, Wrocław and Berlin. The local seminary was converted by the Germans into barracks of the SS.

Despite such circumstances, the city remained the center of the Polish underground resistance movement. In September 1942, the Germans publicly hanged 13 Polish resistance members in the Old Town. In January 1945, the retreating Germans burned 79 Poles alive. The city was restored to Poland, although with a Soviet-installed communist regime, which remained in power until the Fall of Communism in the 1980s.

Recent history
In 1975–1998, Płock was the capital of the Płock Voivodeship. In 1976, Płock was one of the centers of large anti-communist protests.

Climate
Płock has an oceanic climate  (Köppen climate classification: Cfb) using the  isotherm or a humid continental climate (Köppen climate classification: Dfb) using the  isotherm.

Culture and religion

The Museum of Mazovia provides exhibits and interpretation of the city and region's history. Płock is the oldest legislated seat of the Roman Catholic diocese; the Masovian Blessed Virgin Mary Cathedral was built here in the first half of the 12th century and houses the sarcophagi of Polish monarchs. It is one of the five oldest cathedrals in Poland.

Divine Mercy
The city is famous for the Divine Mercy Sanctuary, where the apparition of Jesus to Saint Faustina Kowalska took place, and the Divine Mercy devotion was revealed.

Mariavite Church
From the visions of Feliksa Kozłowska in 1893, the Mariavite order of priests originated, originally working to renew clergy within the Roman Catholic Church. Despite repeated attempts, they were not recognized by the Vatican and in the early 20th century established a separate and independent denomination. This site is the main seat of the Mariavite bishops. Their most important church was built here in the beginning of the 20th century; it is called the Temple of Mercy and Charity and is situated in a pleasant garden on the hill on which the historical centre of Płock is built, near the Vistula River. Poland in total has about 25,000 members of the Old Catholic Mariavite Church, as it is now named, with another 5,000 in France. A smaller breakaway church, the Catholic Mariavite Church, which has an integrated female priesthood (since 1929), has 3,000 members in Poland.

Jewish history
The Jewish presence in Płock (Yiddish: Plotzk) dates back many centuries, probably to the 13th and 14th centuries, when records include them. The Polish kings extended rights to them in 1264 and the 14th century, and provided continued political support through the centuries. At the beginning of the 19th century, their more than 1,200 residents comprised more than 48% of the city's population in what is considered the city's Old Town; through the century, their proportions ranged from 30 and 40 percent. It varied as German migrants were arriving in the region, and the area was becoming urbanized, as more people moved to the city. After Płock fell to Russia in the 19th century, it was part of the Pale of Settlement, where Russians allowed the settlement of Jews. As in other parts of the Russian Partition of Poland, they were restricted to employment in trades and crafts.

In the late 19th century, Jews established two factories to produce farm machines and tools, and the first iron foundry in the city. They had two synagogues and two cemeteries (dating to the 15th century), religious and secular schools, and established a library and hospital. They contributed strongly to the economy and culture of the city. In the early 20th century, they had two newspapers, representing active political parties.

In 1939, Płock had a Jewish population of 9,000, an estimated 26% of the city's total. After the 1939 invasion of Poland, German Nazi persecution began, about 2,000 Jews fled the city, with half going to Soviet-controlled territory. They were assigned to locations far from the front. In 1940, the Nazis established a ghetto in Płock. They started actions against the Jews, killing those in an old people's home and sick children, and transporting others to be killed at Brwilski Forest. Ultimately, they transported the Jews to 20 camps and sites in the Radom district, where in 1942 those still alive were sent to Treblinka to be murdered. There is evidence that a few Poles tried to help their Jewish neighbors in Plock by smuggling food into the ghetto, sneaking food to them while they were awaiting deportation, and throwing loaves of bread to them on the transport trucks. While small acts, they took courage. By 1946, only 300 Jews survived in Płock. While they were active in the new politics, gradually the Jews left, and by 1959 three remained. Herman Kruk, a survivor and notable chronicler of life inside the Nazi concentration camps, was born in Płock in 1897.

The small synagogue, built in 1810, was one of the few to survive World War II in the Masovia region of Poland. The Great Synagogue was destroyed during the Holocaust. The small synagogue was designated as a historic building about 1960, but deteriorated in physical condition while vacant. It was renovated and adapted for use as a museum, opening in April 2013 as the Museum of Masovian Jews, a branch of the Museum of Płock Mazowiecki.

In popular culture
Various Polish films were shot in Płock, including Satan from the Seventh Grade, The Scar, as well as the 1960s TV series Stawka większa niż życie.

Cuisine
The officially protected traditional foods originating from Płock (as designated by the Ministry of Agriculture and Rural Development of Poland) include kiełbasa tumska, a local type of kiełbasa named after Wzgórze Tumskie (Cathedral Hill), and baleron płocki, a local type of baleron, a popular Polish smoked lunch meat.

Economy

The main industry is oil refining, which was established in 1960. The country's largest oil refinery (Płock refinery) and its parent company, PKN Orlen, are located here. It is served by a large pipeline leading from Russia to Germany. Associated industrial activities connected with the refinery are servicing and construction. A Levi Strauss & Co. factory is located in Płock and provides manufacturing jobs.

Education

 Szkoła Wyższa im. Pawła Włodkowica
 Państwowa Wyższa Szkoła Zawodowa w Płocku
 Płock Campus of Warsaw University of Technology
 LO im. Marszałka Stanisława Małachowskiego w Płocku - the oldest school in Poland, dating back to 1180
 LO im. Wladysława Jagiełły w Płocku
 III LO im. Marii Dąbrowskiej w Płocku
 IV LO im. Bolesława Krzywoustego w Płocku

Transport

Mass transit
 KM Płock - Komunikacja Miejska Płock
Bus service covers the entire city, with 41 routes.

Bridges

 
 Solidarity Bridge

Sport

 Wisła Płock – one of Poland's most successful handball teams, playing in the Superliga, Poland's top division, multiple Polish Champion and multiple Polish Cup winner
 Wisła Płock – football team, currently playing in the Ekstraklasa, Poland's top division, Polish Cup and Polish SuperCup winner in 2006

Politics

Members of Parliament (Sejm) elected from Płock constituency
 Julia Pitera, PO
 Mirosław Koźlakiewicz, PO
 Andrzej Nowakowski, PO
 Wojciech Jasiński, Pis
 Marek Opioła, Pis
 Robert Kołakowski, Pis
 Dariusz Kaczanowski, Pis
 Waldemar Pawlak, PSL
 Adam Struzik, PSL
 Jolanta Szymanek-Deresz, SLD+SDPL+PD+UP (died in a plane crash 10 April 2010)

Notable people

Bolesław III Wrymouth (1086–1138), Duke of Poland
Józef Pius Dziekoński (1844–1924), architect and heritage conservator
Kazimierz Zalewski (1849–1919), dramatist, literary and theatre critic
Ludwik Krzywicki (1859–1941), Marxist anthropologist, economist and sociologist
Edward Flatau (1868–1932), neurologist and psychiatrist
Władysław Broniewski (1897–1962), poet, writer, translator and soldier
Stefan Themerson (1910–1988), writer of children's literature, poet and novelist
Rozka Korczak (1921–1988), partisan leader during World War II
Włodzimierz Brus (1921–2007), economist and politician
Antoni Gawryłkiewicz (1922-2007), Holocaust resister and a Righteous among the Nations 
Anna Kochanowska (1922–2019), radio journalist, literary director and politician
Ryszard Syski (1924–2007), Polish-American mathematician 
Tadeusz Mazowiecki (1927–2013), author, journalist, philanthropist and Christian-democratic politician, formerly one of the leaders of the Solidarity movement, and the first non-communist Polish prime minister since 1946
Wojciech Jankowski (born 1963), rower and Olympic medallist
Michał Łogosz (born 1977), badminton player 
Szymon Marciniak (born 1981), football referee
Piotr Więcek (born 1990), drifting driver
Kamil Syprzak (born 1991), handball player 
Paweł Halaba (born 1995), volleyball player
Bartosz Kwolek (born 1997), volleyball player, 2018 World Champion
Marcin Bułka (born 1999), goalkeeper

Twin towns - sister cities

Płock is twinned with:

Former twin towns:
 Novopolotsk, Belarus (since 1996 until 2022)
 Mytishchi in Russia (since 2006 until 2022)

In March 2022, Płock suspended its partnership with the Russian city of Mytishchi and the Belarusian city of Novopolotsk as a response to the 2022 Russian invasion of Ukraine.

See also
Duke Capital City of Płock
New Holland Agriculture
Płock Department

References

External links

 Official website
 Photogallery of Płock
 Interactive map
 Jewish Community in Płock on Virtual Shtetl
 Zumi maps
 Anthem of Płock

 
Cities and towns in Masovian Voivodeship
City counties of Poland
Former capitals of Poland
Płock Governorate
Populated places on the Vistula
Warsaw Voivodeship (1919–1939)
Holocaust locations in Poland